Chesley William Carter (July 29, 1902 – January 14, 1994) was a Canadian Member of Parliament representing the riding of Burin—Burgeo and a senator for Grand Bank, Newfoundland and Labrador.

Biography 
Born in Pass Island, Hermitage Bay, Newfoundland, Carter, educated at Church of England School, Pass Island and Bishop Feild College, St. John's served in the Royal Newfoundland Regiment from 1917 to 1919. In 1941 he joined the Canadian Army to fight in World War II and discharged with the rank of Major in 1946. Carter entered politics in 1949, following Newfoundland's entry into Canadian Confederation, and was elected to the House of Commons as a Liberal in the 1949 federal election. He was re-elected in 1953, 1957 (when he was elected by acclamation), 1958, 1962, 1963 and 1965. On July 8, 1966 he was appointed to the Senate where he remained until he retired on July 28, 1977.

References

External links 
 

Canadian educators
Canadian senators from Newfoundland and Labrador
Members of the House of Commons of Canada from Newfoundland and Labrador
Liberal Party of Canada MPs
Liberal Party of Canada senators
Newfoundland military personnel of World War II
Canadian Army personnel of World War II
Newfoundland military personnel of World War I
1902 births
1994 deaths
Place of death missing
Bishop Feild School alumni
Dominion of Newfoundland people
Royal Newfoundland Regiment soldiers
Canadian Army officers